The Scheibe SF 36 is a German two-seat self-launched powered sailplane designed and built by Scheibe Aircraft.

Design
The SF 36 is an all composite sailplane with an engine mounted at the front. It is a low-wing monoplane with airbrakes fitted to the upper surface, it can be fitted with either a fixed or retractable central monowheel landing gear. The SF 36 has a cruciform tail with a fixed horizontal stabilizer and an enclosed cabin which has two seats side by side.

The SF 36 is available in two variants, the SF 36A powered by either a Limbach or Sauer piston engine, and the Rotax-powered SF 36R.

Variants 
SF 36 A
Powered by either a Limbach L2000 EA, Sauer S 2100-1-HS1 or Sauer S 2100-1-SS1 engine.
SF 36 R
Rotax 912-powered variant.

Specifications (SF 36A)

References

1980s German civil utility aircraft
Motor gliders
Scheibe
Low-wing aircraft
Single-engined tractor aircraft
Aircraft first flown in 1980